The 1949 Clemson Tigers football team was an American football team that represented Clemson College in the Southern Conference during the 1949 college football season. In its tenth season under head coach Frank Howard, the team compiled a 4–4–2 record (2–2 against conference opponents), tied for seventh place in the Southern Conference, and outscored opponents by a total of 232 to 216. The team played its home games at Memorial Stadium in Clemson, South Carolina.

The team's statistical leaders included wingback Ray Mathews with 487 passing yards and 728 rushing yards and fullback Fred Cone with 55 points scored (9 touchdowns an 1 extra point).

Center Gene Moore was the team captain. Fullback Fred Cone and wingback Ray Mathews were selected as first-team players on the 1949 All-Southern Conference football team. Cone, Mathews, and end John Poulos were named to the All-South Carolina football team for 1949.

Schedule

References

Clemson
Clemson Tigers football seasons
Clemson Tigers football